H&C Communications is a defunct corporation that owned a number of media outlets throughout the United States.  Originally known as Channel 2 Television Company, a reference to the channel number of flagship station KPRC-TV, it was created in 1983 to unite the Hobby family's television & radio interests under one umbrella after the Houston Post, their flagship business, was sold.  The family became involved in broadcasting in the mid-1920s.

Beginnings
In 1923, Ross Sterling Jr. took a course on broadcasting at the YMCA in Houston.  His father, Ross Sterling Sr., met the instructor, Alfred P. Daniel (of now-discontinued radio station WCAK), and discussed starting a new radio station affiliated with the Houston Post. William P. Hobby, the president and publisher of the Post, asked Sterling to launch the radio station.  Before a 500 watt transmitter ordered from the Westinghouse Electric Manufacturing Co. arrived in Houston, Sterling Jr. died.  Sterling Sr., mourning the loss of his son, put the still crated transmitter in storage. Over one year later, Daniel approached Sterling Sr. and asked about proceeding with the establishment of the radio station.  Sterling Sr. agreed with the idea and moved forward with establishing the station. KPRC's first broadcast occurred on Saturday May 9, 1925, with Daniel as the station's first announcer and program director.  The federal license granting permission for radio broadcasts on 920 kHz was issued on the 13th of May.  (In 1941, KPRC moved to its current frequency of 950 kHz under terms of the North American Regional Broadcasting Agreement.)

Houston Cluster
On December 24, 1946, KPRC-FM (now 99.1 KODA) signed on the air.  On June 1, 1950, the Hobbys purchased KLEE-TV Channel 2 and changed the television station's call letters on July 3, 1950 to KPRC-TV to create an AM-FM-TV combination. The television station had signed on the air on January 1, 1949, as KLEE-TV.  It was Houston's first television station and the second one to sign on in Texas, three months behind Fort Worth station WBAP-TV (now KXAS-TV) and over eight months ahead of Dallas station KBTV (now WFAA).  It was originally owned by hotelier W. Albert Lee and carried programming from all four networks of the day – NBC, CBS, ABC, and DuMont.  After a year of difficulty, Lee sold the station to the Hobby family.

After the Hobbys took over, Channel 2 became a primary NBC affiliate due to KPRC-AM radio's longstanding affiliation with the NBC Red Network, a link that remains today.  Due to the Federal Communications Commission-imposed freeze on new station licenses, Channel 2 remained the only television station in Houston for four more years.  CBS moved to KGUL-TV (channel 11, now KHOU) in 1953 and KTRK-TV (channel 13) took over the ABC affiliation when it signed on one year later. DuMont ceased operations in 1956, though it was briefly affiliated with now-defunct KNUZ-TV (channel 39, frequency now occupied by KIAH).

Expansion to Liquidation
In 1958, the FM station was sold.  In 1975, the Channel 2 Television Company acquired their second TV station, WLAC-TV, the CBS affiliate in Nashville, TN from Houston-based insurer American General Corporation.  American General bought Life and Casualty Insurance Company of Tennessee in the 1960s and the acquisition included the WLAC-AM-FM-TV station assets.  On December 1, 1975, the TV station adopted the current WTVF call sign due to an FCC rule in place at the time forbidding TV and radio stations in the same city, but with different owners, from sharing the same call letters.

More TV stations across the United States were acquired by the company within the next few years.  In 1983, after the Post was sold, the Hobby family's broadcast holdings were reorganized into H&C Communications. The Hobbys began to liquidate their broadcasting assets in 1992.  An attempt to sell stations in Houston, San Antonio, Orlando, Tucson and Des Moines to Young Broadcasting that year was unsuccessful.  On April 22, 1994 the Texas stations, flagship KPRC-TV in Houston and KSAT-TV in San Antonio were sold to Post-Newsweek Stations (now Graham Media Group), a division of the Washington Post Company (now Graham Holdings Company).

In 1994, the Hobby family fully relinquished control and by the end of 1995, the H&C stations were liquidated to various owners and the company was eventually dissolved.

Former Properties
Stations are arranged in order of acquisition.

Notes:
 (**) - Indicates stations built and signed on by the Hobby family.

Television stations

Radio stations

The Eyes of Texas
Produced by flagship station KPRC-TV, H&C maintained the rights to The Eyes of Texas and was the syndicator of the program to stations across the state of Texas.

References

Defunct broadcasting companies of the United States
Mass media companies established in 1983
Mass media companies disestablished in 1995